"No Shopping" is a single by American rapper French Montana, from his mixtape MC4. The track features a guest appearance from Toronto-based rapper Drake. It was released on July 16, 2016. The hip hop track was produced by Murda Beatz and Cubeatz. The song was certified Gold by the Recording Industry Association of America (RIAA) in December 2016, for selling over 500,000 digital copies in the United States.

Music video
The music video premiered on MTV on July 29, 2016.

Charts

Weekly charts

Year-end charts

Certifications

Release history

References

2016 singles
2016 songs
French Montana songs
Drake (musician) songs
Bad Boy Records singles
Interscope Records singles
Songs written by Drake (musician)
Songs written by French Montana
Song recordings produced by Murda Beatz
Song recordings produced by Cubeatz
Songs written by Murda Beatz
Songs written by Tim Gomringer
Songs written by Kevin Gomringer